Abaiara is a city in the region of the Kiriri people, in the state of Ceará, Brazil. The population in 2020 was 11,853 people.

Etymology 
The city was first named, in 1873, "Distrito de São Pedro", as a tribute to the Brazilian emperor Pedro II. In 1938 the name was changed to "Pedro Segundo". In 1943 the city received its current name, "Abaiara", this name in Tupi means "the lord of men", (still as a reference and tribute to D. Pedro II).

History
Its history goes back to the 19th century, when two farmers, José Leite da Cunha and José Júlio Sampaio, settled in the area.

Political evolution 
The first political event occurred just after the creation of the Distrito da Paz on March 27, 1873. Abaiara was first elevated to the condition of Vila on December 20, 1938, under the name of Pedro Segundo. The name was not very popular with the inhabitants and was soon replaced with the current name on December 30, 1943. Abaiara was elevated to the status of municipality on March 25, 1957.

Religion 
The first non-indigenous religious event took place when Father José Antônio de Araújo erected the first church which later became the central point in the city. With the growth of the city and the natural degradation of the first church, it became obvious that a new church was necessary. This second was built next to the first one (to avoid hurting the feelings of the population). The second church was dedicated to the Immaculate Heart of Mary and was made possible due to the actions of José Júlio Sampaio. However, the official saint remained Sacred Heart of Jesus.

Climate 
The climate is warm tropical and semi-arid with rainfall of 669 millimeters and concentrated rains between January and April. The average temperature is between 30 °C and 18 °C.

References

External links 
 Satellite view of Abaiara
 Location of city within the state

Municipalities in Ceará